Monte Caruso is a mountain in Basilicata, southern Italy.

Mountains of Basilicata
Mountains of the Apennines
One-thousanders of Italy